Acarodynerus exarmatus is a species of wasp in the family Vespidae. It is native to Australia.

References

Potter wasps